Brad Cruikshank (born February 14, 1979 in Kelowna, British Columbia) is a Canadian ice hockey winger.

Career 
Cruikshank began his professional career in 1999, playing in the ECHL with the Toledo Storm, followed by a season in the Central Hockey League with the Fayetteville Force.  He then returned to the ECHL with the Pensacola Ice Pilots where he spent three seasons.  He moved to the United Hockey League in 2004, signing for the Motor City Mechanics.  In 2005, he moved to the Basingstoke Bison where he became very popular with the fans for his rough style of play.  On 22 October 2008 Cruikshank left Basingstoke Bison and moved to the Sheffield Steelers, winning an EIHL League and Playoff double.

Cruikshank was released from the Sheffield Steelers, on 25 January 2010. The next day he signed for the Coventry Blaze for the remainder of the 2009/10 season and winning the EIHL League title for a second consecutive season.

Career statistics

External links

1979 births
Basingstoke Bison players
Calgary Hitmen players
Canadian ice hockey right wingers
Coventry Blaze players
Edmonton Ice players
Fayetteville Force players
Ice hockey people from British Columbia
Lethbridge Hurricanes players
Living people
Motor City Mechanics players
Pensacola Ice Pilots players
Sheffield Steelers players
Sportspeople from Kelowna
Toledo Storm players
Canadian expatriate ice hockey players in England